Marjan Burgar (born 15 January 1952) is a Slovenian biathlete. He competed in the 20 km individual event at the 1980 Winter Olympics.

References

1952 births
Living people
Slovenian male biathletes
Olympic biathletes of Yugoslavia
Biathletes at the 1980 Winter Olympics